This article displays the squads for the 2022 European Men's Handball Championship. Each team had a provisional list of 35 players. Each roster consisted of up to 20 players, of whom 16 may be fielded for each match.

Age, club, caps and goals as of 13 January 2022.

Group A

Denmark
A 20-player squad was announced on 16 December. On 15 January Hans Lindberg replaced an injured Jóhan Hansen.

Head coach: Nikolaj Jacobsen

Montenegro
A 25-player squad was announced on 18 December.

Head coach: Zoran Roganović

North Macedonia
A 24-player squad was announced on 17 December.

Head coach: Kiril Lazarov

Slovenia
A -player squad was announced on 26 December.

Head coach:  Ljubomir Vranjes

Group B

Hungary
A 21-player squad was announced on 23 December.

Head coach: István Gulyás

Iceland
A 20-player squad was announced on 21 December. Sveinn Jóhannsson was replaced by Daníel Þór Ingason on 5 January, as he was injured.

Head coach: Guðmundur Guðmundsson

Netherlands
A 16-player squad was announced on 13 December.

Head coach:  Erlingur Richardsson

Portugal
A 19-player squad was announced on 27 December. The final roster was revealed on 11 January.

Head coach: Paulo Pereira

Group C

Croatia
An 18-player squad was announced on 30 December.

Head coach: Hrvoje Horvat

France
A 20-player squad was announced on 28 December. On 23 December it was announced that Nedim Remili would miss the tournament, due to a foot injury. Luka Karabatić had to withdraw on 31 December, due to an injury. Due to positive COVID-19 tests by some players, some changes were made on 2 January 2022. An updated 20-player roster was nominated on 7 January.

Head coach: Guillaume Gille

Serbia
A 24-player squad was announced on 15 December. After some changes, with Petar Nenadić missing the tournament due to an injury, the list was reduced to 21 players on 2 January.

Head coach:  Toni Gerona

Ukraine
A 24-player squad was announced on 19 December. It was reduced to 21 on 2 January.

Head coach:  Michael Biegler

Group D

Austria
An 18-player squad was announced on 22 December. The final roster was revealed on 12 January.

Head coach:  Aleš Pajovič

Belarus
A 25-player squad was announced on 16 December. It was reduced to 18 on 4 January.

Head coach: Yuri Shevtsov

Germany
A 19-player squad was announced on 21 December.

Head coach:  Alfreð Gíslason

Poland
A 26-player squad was announced on 22 December. It was cut to 21 on 31 December. Due to seven positive COVID-19 tests, some changes were made on 12 January. Rafał Przybylski was added to the squad on 16 January. Piotr Chrapkowski, Jan Czuwara and Dawid Dawydzik were added to the squad on 20 January. Damian Przytuła was added to the squad on 21 January.

Head coach: Patryk Rombel

Group E

Bosnia and Herzegovina
A 21-player squad was announced on 23 December.

Head coach:  Ivica Obrvan

Czech Republic
A 21-player squad was announced on 31 December.

Head coach: Rastislav Trtík

Spain
A 19-player squad was announced on 30 December.

Head coach: Jordi Ribera

Sweden
An 18-player squad was announced on 13 December. On 10 January it was announced Emil Mellegård would replace Lucas Pellas due to COVID-19. On 17 January Valter Chrintz joined the squad due to a positive COVID-19 test from Daniel Pettersson. On 19 January Isak Persson joined the squad due to a positive COVID-19 test from Niclas Ekberg. On 24 January Jonathan Edvardsson joined the squad due to a positive COVID-19 test from Felix Claar. On 27 January Linus Persson joined the squad due to a positive COVID-19 test from Lukas Sandell. On January 28 Lucas Pellas joined the squad due to a positive COVID-19 test from Hampus Wanne.

Head coach:  Glenn Solberg

Group F

Lithuania
A 19-player squad was announced on 10 January.

Head coach: Mindaugas Andriuška

Norway
A 20-player squad was announced on 8 December. On 23 December it was announced that Gøran Johannessen would miss the tournament, due to a groin injury. On 24 January, Endre Langaas was added to the squad.

Head coach: Christian Berge

Russia
A 22-player squad was announced on 26 December.

Head coach:  Velimir Petković

Slovakia
A 21-player squad was announced on 27 December. Michal Konečný was replaced by Igor Chupryna on 4 January 2022.

Head coach: Peter Kukučka

Statistics

Coaches representation by country
Coaches in bold represent their own country.

Player representation by league system
In all, European Championship squad members play for clubs in 36 different countries.

References

External links
Official website

Squads
European Handball Championship squads